Jaipur International Airport  is an international airport serving Jaipur, the capital of Rajasthan. It is the 11th busiest airport in India in daily scheduled flight operations.

The airport was granted the status of international airport on 29 December 2005. The airport's apron can accommodate 14 aircraft, and the new integrated terminal building can handle up to 1,000 passengers at peak hours.

Runway

The runway 9/27 is CAT-IIIB instrument landing system (ILS) compliant. This facilitates the landing of aircraft on a runway visibility range (RVR) of up to  during fog. CAT III B became operational from 8 December 2016. A taxiway has been planned for Jaipur Airport, parallel to runway 9/27 to deal with its air traffic congestion. The work will be completed in the end of May 2018, after the completion the airport will be able to accommodate 16 flights in an hour.

Terminals

Terminal 2

The new domestic terminal building at the airport was inaugurated on 1 July 2009. The domestic terminal building has a peak hour passenger handling capacity of 500 passengers and an annual handling capacity of 400,000. The entrance gate is made of sandstone and Dholpur stones along with Rajasthani paintings on the walls. The terminal is currently integrated to allow both international and domestic flights. To manage the hordes of VIP's who fly in and out of the Pink City, the airport has three VIP lounges to ensure that the visiting guests and commuters do not cause inconvenience to each other. Terminal 2 is spread over twenty three thousand meter square in area and has 14 airport check-in counters, six immigration counters, four customs counters, and four security counters that can easily accommodate the passenger traffic at the airport and provide them a hassle free experience.

Terminal 1
Terminal 1 used to operate international flights until July 2012, when the airport authorities decided to shift the international flights to the newly built Terminal 2 to reserve Terminal 1 for cargo operations. After four years, in 2017, the airport administration began preparations to resume commercial flight operations in the old terminal due to increasing passenger load on Terminal 2. Presently, only Hajj and cargo flights are operated from Terminal 1. To shift the flights to Terminal 1, a part of the cargo operations will have to be shifted from there. Renovation work of Terminal 1 started in December 2017 and there are plans to make it operational by May 2019. Terminal 1 will be renovated in Rajasthani look. After the completion of renovation, Terminal 1 will be fully upgraded and expanded to 18,000 square meters and it will cater to only international departures and arrivals.

Air cargo complex

Beginning from 16 July 2012, Terminal 1 was closed to passenger traffic and was remodeled to handle solely cargo operations. The cargo facility is being provided by Rajasthan Small Scale Industries, a public sector undertaking of Government of Rajasthan. To shift the flights to Terminal 1, a part of the cargo operations will have to be shifted there.

Modernisation and expansion of terminals
The current Terminal 2 will be expanded in a width of around 20 meters on each side. A new hall will be made in the departure area and 3 conveyor belts will be established in the arrival area with 2 new aerobridges to ease passenger movement. The work will be completed by May. The new departure area is spread in 2,700 square metres while the arrival area was constructed in an area of nearly 23,000 square feet.

A new integrated third terminal with amenities will come up in the following years, with an area seven times larger than Terminal 2, which will negate the need for passenger operations at previous Terminals 1 and 2.

Airlines and destinations

Statistics

Expansion
In order to cope with the growing traffic, the airport's traffic will be exceeding from 5 million passengers per year to over 10 million passengers in the next five years. In view of this, the old terminal building, which is now inactive for passenger traffic and is mainly used for cargo handling, will be reopened, and along with this, a third terminal is also proposed, which will be built on the eastern side of the new terminal, at an area of more than 1.25 lakh square meters. It will be seven times the size of the new terminal and will increase the capacity of the airport further. It is expected to be completed by 2026/27.

New airport
The Jaipur Development Authority (JDA) finalised the proposal for the acquisition a land area covering about 2,100 hectares in 2017. The new airport project has received in-principle approval from the state government, and the JDA is currently on a social impact assessment study, after which the survey for land acquisition will begin, and construction will begin after the completion of land acquisition.

Awards
The airport was declared as the World's Best Airport in the category of 2 to 5 million passengers per annum three consecutive times in 2015, 2016 and 2018 by Airports Council International.

Incidents
On 18 February 1969, Douglas DC-3 VT-CJH of Indian Airlines crashed on take-off on a scheduled passenger flight. The aircraft was overloaded and take-off was either downwind or with a crosswind. All 30 people on board survived.
On 5 January 2014, Flight AI-890 Airbus A320 VT-ESH of Air India from Imphal to Delhi via Guwahati was diverted to Jaipur Airport due to heavy fog in Delhi. The rear tire of the plane burst during landing, damaging the right wing. The plane received substantial damage and the aircraft was written off. All 173 passengers and 6 crew members survived.

See also
ASQ awards 2015 by Airports Council International
 Airports in India
 List of busiest airports in India by passenger traffic

References

External links

 
 

Airports in Rajasthan
Transport in Jaipur
International airports in India
Year of establishment missing